Webster Township, Indiana may refer to one of the following places:

 Webster Township, Harrison County, Indiana
 Webster Township, Wayne County, Indiana

See also

Webster Township (disambiguation)

Indiana township disambiguation pages